Roseville is a village in Warren County, Illinois, United States. The population was 989 at the 2010 census. It is part of the Galesburg Micropolitan Statistical Area.

Geography

Demographics

As of the census of 2000, there were 1,083 people, 438 households, and 296 families residing in the village. The racial makeup of the village was 99.45% White, 0.18% African American, 0.18% Native American, 0.09% Asian, and 0.09% from two or more races. Hispanic or Latino of any race were 0.46% of the population.

There were 438 households, out of which 28.1% had children under the age of 18 living with them, 54.8% were married couples living together, 10.0% had a female householder with no husband present, and 32.2% were non-families. 29.5% of all households were made up of individuals, and 17.8% had someone living alone who was 65 years of age or older. The average household size was 2.31 and the average family size was 2.83.

In the village, the population was spread out, with 21.6% under the age of 18, 7.0% from 18 to 24, 22.0% from 25 to 44, 22.4% from 45 to 64, and 27.0% who were 65 years of age or older. The median age was 44 years. For every 100 females, there were 80.5 males. For every 100 females age 18 and over, there were 74.7 males.

The median income for a household in the village was $32,031, and the median income for a family was $37,125. Males had a median income of $30,625 versus $18,594 for females. The per capita income for the village was $16,225. About 9.1% of families and 10.8% of the population were below the poverty line, including 13.0% of those under age 18 and 6.0% of those age 65 or over.

Notable people

 Larry Burright, first baseman with the New York Mets and Los Angeles Dodgers
 Emma Smith DeVoe, suffragist; born in Roseville
 Hi West, pitcher for the Cleveland Naps; born in Roseville

References

External links
 Village of Roseville official website

Villages in Warren County, Illinois
Villages in Illinois
Galesburg, Illinois micropolitan area